Please Please Me is a 1963 album by the Beatles.

Please Please Me may also refer to:

 "Please Please Me" (song), a 1963 song by the Beatles
 "Please Please Me" (Holly Valance song), 2003
 Please, Please Me!, the English title of the 2009 film Fais-moi plaisir!